Pehuenches is a department located in the northeast of Neuquén Province, Argentina.

Geography
The department limits at north with Mendoza province, at northeast with La Pampa Province and at east with Rio Negro Province, Añelo Department at south, Loncopué Department at South-SouthWest, Picún Leufú Department in the southwest, Minas Department in the northwest.

Departments of Neuquén Province